Barytettix is a genus of spur-throated grasshoppers in the family Acrididae. There are about nine described species in Barytettix, found in western Mexico and the southwestern United States.

Species
These species belong to the genus Barytettix:
 Barytettix contilus Cohn & Cantrall, 1974
 Barytettix crassus Scudder, 1897
 Barytettix humphreysii (Thomas, C., 1875) (Humphrey's grasshopper)
 Barytettix nigrofasciatus Cohn & Cantrall, 1974
 Barytettix paloviridis Cohn & Cantrall, 1974
 Barytettix poecila (Hebard, 1925)
 Barytettix psolus Cohn & Cantrall, 1974
 Barytettix terminalis Cohn & Cantrall, 1974
 Barytettix tridens Cohn & Cantrall, 1974

References

External links

 

Acrididae